Karl Badberger (14 January 1888, in Munich – ??) was a German architect.

Biography 
Badberger graduated at the Technical University of Munich in 1911, became Regierungsbaumeister in 1919 and joined the Bayerische Staatsbauverwaltung (Bavarian State Construction Administration) in 1920. Afterwards he served as a Ministerialrat at the Reichs Ministry of Finance in Berlin. After World War II, in the rank of an Oberregierungsbaudirektor, he led the Bundesbaudirektion (Federal Building Authority) in Bonn.

Works (selection) 
 1922: war memorial of the former Bavarian railroad troops of World War I, Eisenbahnkaserne
 1926–1928: Landesamt für Maß und Gewicht (regional office of measures and weights), Munich

Publications
 Badberger, Karl: Das Münchener Kriegerdenkmal, in the Süddeutsche Baugewerkszeitung, 28. Jg., No. 8, 20. 4. 1925, pp. 105–108.
 Badberger, Karl: Bundeswohnungsbau in Bonn, in Die Bauverwaltung 1 (1952), pp. 87–91.

Awards 
 Order of Merit of the Federal Republic of Germany (1953)
 Order of St. Sylvester

References

External links
 
 

20th-century German architects
Architects from Munich
1888 births
Year of death unknown
Officers Crosses of the Order of Merit of the Federal Republic of Germany
Technical University of Munich alumni